The 2009 AFF U-16 Youth Championship was due to take place in Bangkok, Thailand between the 20 July and 2 August 2009, it was later moved to start on 6 August until 19 August but was eventually cancelled one month prior to the opening day due to the H1N1 virus in the country.

Participating nations 

Did not enter:

Tournament

Group stage

Group A

Group B

Knockout stage

Semi-final

Third place play-off

Final

References

External links 
AFF U16 Youth Championship 2009 at ASEAN Football Federation official website

under
2009 in Thai football
2009
2009
Cancelled association football competitions
2009 in youth association football